Judaism in Dagestan is mainly practiced by Mountain Jews. By the beginning of the 8th century BCE Mountain Jews had reached Persia from Israel. Under the Sasanian Empire, with the arrival in Dagestan of Iranian-speaking tribes from the north, they settled in different regions of the Caucasus.

According to the 2002 census, there were 3.4 thousand Jews in Dagestan (in Makhachkala - 430 Jews (0.08%), Mountain Jews - 61 people (0.01%).

History
References to the Jewish communities existing in the Caucasus are found in the works of Armenian, Georgian and Arab historians. In particular, Faustus of Byzantium, Elishe, Movses Kaghankatvatsi, Movses Khorenatsi and Al-Masudi. This is also evidenced by historical field research, which reveals many legends associated with the existence of Judaism in the region. Petroglyphs with the star of David and other symbols of the Jewish faith have been found in many regions of Dagestan. The toponymy of the North-Eastern Caucasus has preserved many names associated with the Jews. In particular, the mountain village of Tabasaransky District is called Dzhugud-kala (literally, “Jewish fortress”, “fortress of the Jews”); the gorge near Madzhalis is Dzhut-Gatta, and the mountain in this area is Dzhufudag, which is, the “Jewish Mountain”.

The settlement area of Mountain Jews completely coincides with the territory occupied by the Sasanian settlers during the times of Kavad I and Khosrow I Anushirvan. Almost all chronicles from written sources, toponymy, petroglyphs and folklore related to Judaism were recorded precisely on those lands where functioned the border posts of the Sassanids and then the Arabs: in modern  Derbentsky, Tabasaransky, Kaytagsky, Suleyman-Stalsky, Khivsky, Magaramkentsky, Akhtynsky, Rutulsky, Agulsky districts of Dagestan. Moreover, it was in those settlements that were the strongholds of those boards (Dzhalgan, Jarrakh, Nyugdi, Khanzhalkala, Mamrach, etc.). The material traces of Jewish communities are best preserved in the vicinity of Derbent, as well as on the lands of historical Tabasaran and Kaytag.

Adam Olearius, who visited Dagestan in the first half of the 17th century, writes about the Jewish population of Kaitag, Tabasaran and Derbent.
He noted: 

 

In another place he wrote: 

 

The same words are repeated in the work of Jan Jansen Struys, a Dutch traveler who visited Dagestan in 1670: 

Faustus of Byzantium writes that Armenian king Tigranes the Great (95 – 55 BC) brought Jews in for the first time from Palestine to Caucasus and settled them in mountain gorges in the 1st century BC.
The Jewish colonists remained an influential military force in the Caucasus for many centuries, until the conquest of Armenia by Shapur II (309 – 379 BC) carried out a devastating campaign in Armenia, led away tens of thousands of Jewish colonists and settled them in Iran.

Modern Time
In the 2000s in Dagestan were 4 synagogues, of which three were in Makhachkala, Derbent, Buynaksk, one prayer house was in Khasavyurt.
In Derbent, there is a Jewish community and the Sephardic synagogue "Kele-Numaz". Also, Vatan, the only newspaper in Russia in the Mountain Jewish language (Juhuri). 
There are only 6 clergymen of the Jewish religious denomination operating in Dagestan (community chairmen, cantors and acting rabbis). Sunday schools functioned at the synagogues. There were no higher and secondary Jewish educational institutions in the republic.

References

Religion in Dagestan
Jews and Judaism in Russia